Givi Ivanovich Onashvili (born July 27, 1947) is a Georgian judoka who competed for the Soviet Union in the 1972 Summer Olympics, and won the bronze medal in the heavyweight class.

Onashvili won a bronze medal in the 1969 World Judo Championships in Mexico City. He is a double European Champion (London 1974 and Lyon 1975), three times silver medalist (Oostende 1969, Voorburg 1972 and Kiev 1976) and bronze medalist in Göteborg 1971. In 1976 he won a silver medal in the International Tournament of Paris.

External links
 

Male judoka from Georgia (country)
Soviet male judoka
Olympic judoka of the Soviet Union
Judoka at the 1972 Summer Olympics
Olympic bronze medalists for the Soviet Union
Olympic medalists in judo
1947 births
Living people
Medalists at the 1972 Summer Olympics